Jason Piper is a British actor who voiced the part of the centaur Bane in the fifth film adaptation of the Harry Potter books: Harry Potter and the Order of the Phoenix.

Piper has danced the role of the Swan (principal role) in Matthew Bourne's Swan Lake for two seasons in London and in the production's world tour. He used to play in bands called CREON and GUS. In November 2006 Jason joined Kylie Minogue on her Showgirl Homecoming Tour.

He is a tutor and Head of Dance at Kingston University. He has choreographed for many shows. He joined Matthew Bourne's Dorian Gray as Basil in summer 2009 and completed the international tour.

Partial filmography
Harry Potter and the Order of the Phoenix (2007) – Centaur

External links
Jason Piper official website
Review of Swan Lake performance.
Jason Piper fan club

British male ballet dancers
British male voice actors
Year of birth missing (living people)
Living people
Place of birth missing (living people)
21st-century British male actors